Fernando Daniel Morillo Rivas (born 14 April 1999), known professionally as Micro TDH, is a Venezuelan singer, rapper and songwriter. He was awarded at the Union Rock Show Awards as "Mejor artista revelación" in 2016.

Known for singles like "Cafuné", "Bésame sin sentir", "Aquí Estoy", among others. He gained greater popularity internationally thanks to his collaboration on the song "Te vi" with the Colombian group Piso 21, "Demasiado Tarde" as a duet with Lenny Tavárez, "Dime Cuantas Veces Remix" with Rels B, Lenny Tavárez & Justin Quiles, and his most recent single with Myke Towers, "El Tren".

Biography 
Fernando was born on April 14, 1999, in the city of Mérida, Mérida State, Venezuela. At the age of 4, he began to feel interest in music, participating in Christmas spots and regional radio programs. At the age of 12, he decides to venture into rap music, debuting as a freestyler in the streets of Mérida, where he became known as MC microbio. And later "MC Micro" is born. His history in the music industry begins with the record company The Dog House, from where he formed his name as Micro TDH.

Career 
His first production was with the group The Dog House (TDH), with whom he made a mixtape called The Dog House Mixtape Vol. 1", made up of a total of eight songs, in which he also shared lyrics with Misterio MC, Kaba, J-Force, among others.

Later in 2016 he signed a contract with the company Los Vatos Inc, which was directed by the ragpicker Neutro Shorty, with which he was until the end of 2018.

He won two awards at the sixth edition of the Pepsi Music Awards Venezuela in the category "Mejor tema Hip Hop" with the theme of Cafuné and "Artista refrescante".

He has collaborated with several international artists such as Big Soto, Akapellah, Rels b, Piso 21, Khan, Gera MX, Justin Quiles, Myke Towers and Lenny Tavarez. In collaboration with the latter, he has released the single "Demasiado Tarde" which has more than 160 million views on YouTube and is part of the artist's first compositions in the recording studio in the city of Medellin, Colombia after being signed by the musical production company Big Ligas.

In 2020, he released the video clip for the song "Ámate".

On June 28, 2021, Micro TDH has signed an exclusive record deal with Warner Music Latina.

Discography

EPs and albums

Singles

References 

Venezuelan male singers
Venezuelan composers
Reggae singers
Venezuelan rappers
1999 births
Living people